Abdulkareem Salem Abdallah Al-Ali Enezi (Arabic: عبد الكريم العلي; born on 25 March 1991),  is a Qatari footballer, who plays as a left back.

International career

International goals
Scores and results list Qatar's goal tally first.

References

External links

 QSL.com.qa profile
 Goalzz.com profile

1991 births
Living people
Qatari footballers
Al-Rayyan SC players
Al-Sailiya SC players
Al-Arabi SC (Qatar) players
Qatar Stars League players
Qatari Second Division players
2019 AFC Asian Cup players
Association football fullbacks
AFC Asian Cup-winning players
Qatar international footballers